Feldenkirchen is a German surname. Notable people with the surname include:

 Andreas Feldenkirchen, German curler
 Markus Feldenkirchen (born 1975), German journalist and writer
 Wilfried Feldenkirchen (1947–2010), German professor and economic historian

German-language surnames